Santiago Tarrío Ben  (born 21 November 1990) is a Spanish professional golfer who currently plays on the Challenge Tour where has won twice.

Amateur career
Tarrío started playing golf at the age of 7 and turned professional at the age of 17.

Professional career
Tarrío did not start competing internationally until 2016. He had played two events in Spain on the 2015 Alps Tour, missing the cut on each occasion. However he finished 4th at the Alps Tour Qualifying School at the end of 2015, to gain a regular place on the tour for 2016. Tarrío was runner-up in the 72-hole Alps Costa del Sol, three strokes behind Tom Shadbolt, and finished the season 26th on the Order of Merit. He was 19th on the 2017 Order of Merit, finishing a stroke behind James Sharp at the Cervino Open. Tarrío won three events in 2016 and 2017 on the domestic Gambito Tour.

2018 was a break-through year for Tarrío. He won two events on the Alps Tour, the Gösser Open and the 72-hole Open International de la Mirabelle d'Or, was joint runner-up twice and led the Order of Merit, to gain a place on the Challenge Tour for 2019.

Tarrío played on the 2019 Challenge Tour. His best finish was a tied for 4th place at the Open de Bretagne and he finished the season 63rd on the Order of Merit. On the shorterned 2020 Challenge Tour, Tarrío had a fourth place finish at the Dimension Data Pro-Am in South Africa and finished the season with a runner-up finish at the Challenge Tour Grand Final, ending the season 7th on the Order of Merit.

Tarrío won his first Challenge Tour event in June 2021, winning a three-man playoff for the D+D Real Czech Challenge. The following week he was third at the Challenge de Cádiz and his second win a week later at the Challenge de España. In August 2021 he finished solo third at the Hero Open, a European Tour event, after birdies at two of the last three holes.

Professional wins (4)

Challenge Tour wins (2)

Challenge Tour playoff record (1–0)

Alps Tour wins (2)

Team appearances
European Championships (representing Spain): 2018

See also
2021 Challenge Tour graduates

References

External links
 (in Spanish)

Spanish male golfers
People from Arzúa (comarca)
Sportspeople from the Province of A Coruña
1990 births
Living people
20th-century Spanish people
21st-century Spanish people